Nicolae Davidescu (October 24, 1888 – June 12, 1954) was a Romanian symbolist poet and novelist.

Works

Poetry 

 1910: La fântâna Castaliei ("At Castalia's Well") - parnassianist poems
 1916: Inscripţii ("Engravings") - influenced by Charles Baudelaire
 1928 – 1937: Cântecul omului ("The Song of Man") - recreating of the world history, influenced by La Légende des siècles (Victor Hugo).

Novel 

 1912: Zâna din fundul lacului ("The Fairy at the Bottom of the Lake") - an exercise in symbolism;
 1915: Sfinxul ("The Sphinx")
 1928: Vioara mută ("The Muted Violin") - influenced by social psychology;

Literary criticism 

Two collections of his literary criticism were published posthumously:

 1975: Aspecte şi direcţii literare ("Literary Conventions and Directions")
 1977: Poezii, teatru, proză ("Poetry, Drama, Prose").

Nicolae Davidescu collaborated at Viața Românească.

External links 
 Encyclopædia Britannica

1888 births
1954 deaths
20th-century Romanian poets
Romanian male poets
Symbolist poets
Romanian essayists
Writers from Bucharest
Male essayists
20th-century essayists
20th-century Romanian male writers